Archbishop Dmitri (November 2, 1923 – August 28, 2011) was a hierarch of the Orthodox Church in America. He served as archbishop of the church's Diocese of the South from 1978 to 2009 and was the ruling bishop of the Mexican Exarchate from 1972 to 2008.  The territory of the diocese covered fourteen states in the United States – Alabama, Arkansas, Florida, Georgia, Kentucky, Louisiana, Mississippi, New Mexico, North Carolina, Oklahoma, South Carolina, Tennessee, Texas, and Virginia. In Orthodox Christian circles he is sometimes called the Apostle to the South.

Birth
Archbishop Dmitri was born as Robert Roscoe Royster in Teague, Texas on November 2, 1923 and was raised as a Southern Baptist, being baptized (by single immersion) in the name of the Holy Trinity at age 12. Though his father was non-practicing, his mother was devout. Robert was instilled with a deep reverence for the Holy Scriptures at an early age. It was, for this reason, that he and his older sister became convinced that the spirit of Protestantism and the spirit of the Holy Scriptures were incompatible.

Conversion to Orthodoxy
After finding incompatibility between Protestantism and the Holy Scriptures he and his sister began to search for "the original scriptural community and roots of the early church". He later stated:

We began to look around. We visited a number of Churches. We had a big book called the Book of World Religions, or something like that, in which all religions and denominations were described, Rather briefly, but at the same time rather completely. There was a rather complete description of the Eastern Orthodox Church in there. It described the Orthodox Church as being the mother of all Christian Churches. We began to look at the New Testament rather carefully and pick out portions of the New Testament that reflected in some way what the Church was in the Apostolic Age. Really, when you put it together, there is quite a bit of it. It isn't as skimpy or as sketchy a description as it might appear on the surface.

After attending Orthros and Divine Liturgy at age 15 he later recalled: We knew from that moment that we would probably not go anywhere else...It was so evident that something really took place...the Holy Spirit transforming the bread and wine.

The two formally began their inquiry in 1939, with the personal blessing of Archbishop Athenagoras (at the time Archbishop of the Greek Orthodox Archdiocese of America) with Father Daniel Sakalarios as their teacher. He and his sister were eventually received into Orthodoxy in 1941 at Holy Trinity Greek Orthodox Church in Dallas, Texas.

Priesthood and episcopacy
He entered North Texas State University but left in 1943 to join the Army. While in the Army he served as a Japanese language interpreter on the staff of General Douglas MacArthur in the Philippines and Japan.

After leaving the Army he resumed his studies, eventually becoming a Spanish language instructor at Southern Methodist University.  He received his Master of Arts in Spanish.

In 1954, Royster was ordained to the priesthood, and served as the rector of St. Seraphim Orthodox Church in Dallas from then until 1969.  On June 29, 1969, he was consecrated as Bishop of Berkeley, vicar of the Diocese of San Francisco and the West. In 1970, Bishop Dmitri was assigned as Bishop of Washington, auxiliary bishop to Metropolitan Irenaeus (Bekish). On October 19, 1971, Bishop Dmitri was elected Bishop of Hartford and New England.

In 1978, Bishop Dmitri became the first ruling bishop of the newly created Diocese of the South.
He was elevated to the rank of archbishop in 1993.

Being a senior bishop in his church, Dmitri was the locum tenens of the Metropolitan's see and temporary head of the OCA from September 4, 2008 until the election of a new primate, Metropolitan Jonah on November 12, 2008.

On March 31, 2009 the then 85-year-old archbishop was granted retirement from active pastoral duties by the Holy Synod of the OCA.

Death
Archbishop Dmitri died in Dallas on August 28, 2011, on the Julian calendar feast of the Dormition, which was his favorite feast day. Although originally interred in Restland Cemetery in Dallas, Texas, he was disinterred on March 4, 2016 in order to transfer his body to his new tomb in the Saint Seraphim Cathedral also in Dallas. However, when they removed his body from his place of burial, his body was found to be untouched by decay (a sign of sainthood in Orthodox Christianity). This fact was attested to by a local specialist who was hired for the exhumation process.

Bibliography
 articles
 A Christian Understanding of Freedom
 The Commandment of Love
 Confession
 The Goal of Lent
 Liturgical Commemorations in Preparations for the Nativity
 «The Lord Is My Shepherd»
 The Meeting of Our Lord
 Pentecost
 Reconciliation, Education, Evangelization
 St. Thomas Sunday
 The Seventh Sunday of Pascha
 Sunday of the Cross
 The Sundays after Pentecost
 The Theotokos
 «Thus It Becometh Us to Fulfill All Righteousness»
 The Transfiguration of Christ
 The Veneration of the Virgin Mary in the Orthodox Church
 What’s in the Stars? A Close Look at Astrology

 books
The Parables (1996).  St. Vladimir's Seminary Press.  .
The Kingdom of God: The Sermon on the Mount (1997).  St. Vladimir's Seminary Press.  . 
The Miracles of Christ (1999). St. Vladimir's Seminary Press.  .
The Epistle to the Hebrews: A Commentary (2003).  St. Vladimir's Seminary Press.  .
St. Paul's Epistle to the Romans: A Pastoral Commentary (2008).  St. Vladimir's Seminary Press.  .
The Epistle of St. James: A Commentary (2010).  St. Vladimir's Seminary Press.  .

Episcopal succession

Notes

1923 births
2011 deaths
People from Freestone County, Texas
United States Army personnel of World War II
20th-century Eastern Orthodox archbishops
Bishops of the Orthodox Church in America
Converts to Eastern Orthodoxy from Protestantism
21st-century Eastern Orthodox archbishops
Former Baptists
20th-century American clergy
21st-century American clergy